Zielin may refer to the following places:
Zielin, Pomeranian Voivodeship (north Poland)
Zielin, Gryfice County in West Pomeranian Voivodeship (north-west Poland)
Zielin, Gryfino County in West Pomeranian Voivodeship (north-west Poland)